Christophe Sanchez (born 4 October 1972 in Montpellier, France) is a French former professional football who played as a forward. While at Bordeaux he played as a substitute as they won the 2002 Coupe de la Ligue Final.

References

External links

Profile

1972 births
Living people
Footballers from Montpellier
Association football forwards
French footballers
French expatriate footballers
Expatriate footballers in Italy
Montpellier HSC players
Bologna F.C. 1909 players
FC Girondins de Bordeaux players
AS Saint-Étienne players
Venezia F.C. players
FC Sète 34 players
Ligue 1 players
Ligue 2 players
Championnat National players
Serie A players
Serie B players
French people of Spanish descent